Midway, also known as Riverdale Farm, is a historic home and farm complex located near Millington, Albemarle County, Virginia. The main dwelling is a two-story, four-bay brick structure with a two-story porch.  It was built in three sections, with the east wing built during the 1820s and a second structure to the west about 1815; they were connected in the late 19th century.   The east wing features Federal woodwork. A rear (north) kitchen wing was added about 1930.  It is connected to the main house by a two-story hyphen.  Also on the property are a contributing brick kitchen and wood-frame barn. The grounds of Midway were landscaped in 1936 by noted landscape architect Charles Gillette.

It was added to the National Register of Historic Places in 1979.

References

Houses on the National Register of Historic Places in Virginia
Federal architecture in Virginia
Houses completed in 1815
Houses in Albemarle County, Virginia
National Register of Historic Places in Albemarle County, Virginia